Imps* is a comedy film released in 2009. The film stars an ensemble cast and is divided into several segments. IMPS is an acronym for "Immoral Minority Picture Show".

Production

Although released in 2009, Imps* was actually filmed in 1983 and shelved. In 2009, faced with an advertising budget of $500 and culturally irrelevant subject matter, Linda Blair herself considered scrapping the project rather than facing severe disappointment. She later told TMZ: "I've always striven to do my best, to be one of the Great American Actors, and being in this film - if you can call it that - was the greatest mistake of my life." When the interviewer asked her if this was a worse mistake than appearing in the critically panned Exorcist II: The Heretic, she replied, "without a doubt."

Description
The film consists of numerous sketches and parodies. Some of them are a competition of pencil sharpening held in Indiana, a music video from the Marquessa de Sade, and a horror heroine.

Filming
The film was shot in Los Angeles, California.

Cast
 Linda Blair as Jamie
 Colleen Camp as Young Lady
 Julia Duffy as Marjorie
 Erika Eleniak as Brooke
 Michael McKean as Fritz #2
 Georg Stanford Brown as Charlie
 Miguel A. Núñez Jr. as Bopper
 Jennifer Tilly as Joni
 Fred Willard as Dad

Release
The DVD premiered on February 10, 2009.

References

External links

2009 films
2000s English-language films